Alaa Al Aswany (born 26 May 1957) is an Egyptian writer, novelist, and a founding member of the political movement Kefaya.

Early life and career 

Al Aswany was born on 26 May 1957 in Cairo. His mother, Zainab, came from an aristocratic family; her uncle was a Pasha and Minister of Education before the Egyptian Revolution of 1952. His father, Abbas Al Aswany, was from Aswan (in Lower Nubia) and was a lawyer and writer who "is remembered as being a captivating and charismatic speaker with a broad following and loyalty within a cross-section of the Egyptian revolutionary intelligentsia". Abbas Al Aswany wrote a regular back-page essay in the Egyptian weekly magazine Rose al-Yūsuf entitled Aswaaniyat. In 1972, he was "the recipient of the state award for literature". He died when Alaa was 19 years old.

Al Aswany attended Le Lycée Français in Cairo and received a bachelor's degree in dental and oral medicine at Cairo University in 1980. He went on to pursue a master's degree in dentistry at the University of Illinois at Chicago in 1985. He speaks Arabic, English, French, and Spanish. He studied Spanish literature in Madrid.

Al Aswany married his first wife in his early twenties. She was a dentist and they had their son, Seif. They later divorced. When he was 37, he married Eman Taymoor and they had two daughters, May and Nada.

He wrote a weekly literary critique entitled "Parenthetically" in the Egyptian newspaper Al-Sha'ab, and then became responsible for the culture page in the same newspaper. He wrote a monthly political article in the Egyptian newspaper Al-Arabi Al-Nasseri and a weekly article in the Egyptian newspaper Al-Dustour. He wrote a weekly article in the Egyptian newspaper Al-Shorouk. Following the revolution, he wrote a weekly article in Al-Masry Al-Youm on Tuesdays. His articles have been published in leading international newspapers such as The New York Times, Le Monde, El Pais, The Guardian, The Independent, and others.

His second novel, The Yacoubian Building, an ironic depiction of modern Egyptian society, has been widely read in Egypt and throughout the Middle East. His literary works have been translated into 37 languages. They include Armenian, Bosnian, Bulgarian, Castilian, Chinese, Croatian, Danish, Dutch, English, Estonian, Finnish, French, Galician, German, Greek, Hebrew, Icelandic, Italian, Japanese, Korean, Malaysian, Norwegian, Polish, Portuguese, Romanian, Russian, Serbian, Slovak, Slovenian, Spanish, Swedish, and Turkish. In 2006, The Yacoubian Building was adapted into "the biggest budget movie ever produced in Egypt". The movie was screened at international film festivals and was a huge hit in Egypt. However, Al Aswany was banned from attending the premiere. The Yacoubian Building is one of a few movies that addresses social taboos and widespread governmental corruption, such as the rigging of elections. In 2007, The Yacoubian Building was made into a television series of the same name. In fact, many intellectuals believe that this work played a crucial role in triggering revolutionary sentiments among the Egyptian people. Alaa Al Aswany claims that during the Egyptian Revolution of 2011, many protesters approached him and said "We are here because of what you wrote".

Chicago, a novel set in the city in which the author was educated, was published in January 2007 and his Automobile Club of Egypt was published in English in 2016.

Al Aswany's name has also been included in the list of the 500 Most Influential Muslims in the World, issued by the Royal Islamic Strategic Studies Center in Amman, Jordan.
He was number one in The Foreign Policy Top 100 Global Thinkers list 2011.

Al Aswany participated in the Blue Metropolis literary festival in Montreal, June 2008 and April 2010, and was featured in interviews with the CBC programme Writers and Company.

In January 2015, the Gingko Library published Democracy is the Answer: Egypt's Years of Revolution, a collection of newspaper columns written by Al Aswany for Al-Masry Al-Youm between 2011 and 2014.

In 2018, Al Aswany published a novel called Jumhuriyat ka'an (The Republic of False Truths), which takes place in the backdrop of the 2011 Revolution. The English translation of the novel should be available in April 2021.

Role in the revolution 
Al Aswany was in Tahrir Square each of the 18 days before Mubarak fell from power. In fact, he was one of the few prominent people to interview the Mubarak-appointed Prime Minister Ahmed Shafik on an Egyptian channel. Shafik lost his temper under persistent grilling by the novelist and it was the first time for Egyptians to witness a ruler dressed down so severely by a civilian in public. Consequently, it is said that Shafik was fired by the SCAF.

Bibliography (in Arabic)

Novels 
 1990: Awrāq ʾIṣṣām ʾAbd il-ʾĀṭī (The Papers of Essam Abdel Aaty)
 2002: ʿImārat Yaʾqūbiyān (The Yacoubian Building)
 2007: Chicago
 2013: Nādī il-sayyārāt (The Automobile Club of Egypt)

Short stories 
 1990: Alladhī iqtarab wa raʾa ("Who Approached and Saw")
 1998: Jamʾiyat muntaẓirī il-zaʿīm ("Waiting for a Leader")
 2004: Nīrān sadīqa ("Friendly Fire")

Articles 
 2010: Li mā dhā lā yathūr il-Miṣriyūn ("Why Don't Egyptians Revolt?”)
 2011: Hal nastaḥiqq il-dimuqrāṭiyya? ("Do We Deserve Democracy?”)
 2011: Miṣr ʿalā dikkat il-iḥṭiyāṭy ("Egypt on the Reserve Bench")
 2012: Hal akhṭaʾat il-thawra il-Miṣriyya? ("Did the Egyptian Revolution Go Wrong?”)
 2014: Kayf naṣnaʾ il-diktātūr? ("How do we make the Dictator?”)
 Since November 2013, he has been writing a monthly opinion column for the International Herald Tribune/New York Times.

English translations 
 
 
 
 
 Alaa Al Aswany, The Yacoubian Building, HarperPerennial, 2007
 Alaa Al Aswany, The Yacoubian Building, Fourth Estate, 2007
 Alaa Al Aswany, The Yacoubian Building, Humphrey Davies (translator), HarperPerennial, 2006
 Alaa Al Aswany, The Yacoubian Building, Humphrey Davies (translator), The American University in Cairo Press, 2004
Alaa Al Aswany, The Republic of False Truths, S. R. Fellowes (translator), 2021.

Awards 
 2005:  Bashraheel Award for Arabic Novel,
 2005:  The International Cavafi Award
 2006:  The Great Novel Award from Toulon Festival
 2007:  The Culture Award from The Foundation of The Mediterranean
 2007:  Grinzane Cavour Award
 2008:  Bruno-Kriesky Award
 2008:  Friedrich Award
 2010:  University of Illinois Achievement Award
 2011:  Blue Metropolis Award for Arabic Literature
 2012:  Tiziano Terzani Literary Award
 2012:  Mediterranean Cultural Award
 2012:  Johann Philipp Palm Award
2016:   Ordre des Arts et des Lettres

 References 

 Further reading 
 Kostyal, Karen, “Alaa Al Aswany: Voice of Reason” (interview with the author), National Geographic Interactive, nd.
 Mishra, Pankaj. “Where Alaa Al Aswany Is Writing From”, New York Times Magazine, 27 April 2008.
 Salama, Vivian, “A Tale of Some Egyptian: As Yacoubian Building Heads West, the Author Discusses the Story's Message”, Daily Star Egypt, 8 December 2005.
 Alaa Al Aswany interviewed by Jonathan Heawood, English PEN at the London Book Fair, 2008, podcast
 Watch a video interview with Alaa al Aswany talking about Chicago on The Interview Online
 Interview with Alaa al Aswany at the World Book Club
 https://www.npr.org/2008/12/07/97897234/egyptian-students-explore-america-in-chicago
 Review of “Chicago”, Ambassadors Online Magazine, July 2009

Beskova, Katarina (2020). "A Bleak Portrait of the Revolution: Alaa al-Aswany's Jumhuriya ka'an". Asian and African Studies''. 29 (2): 166–191. *

External links 
 
 Alaa Al Aswany Official Facebook page 

1957 births
Living people
Egyptian novelists
Egyptian dentists
Democracy activists from Cairo
Egyptian people of Nubian descent
Egyptian revolutionaries
Writers from Cairo
Chevaliers of the Ordre des Arts et des Lettres
Cairo University alumni
Former Muslim critics of Islam